The History of Tom Jones, a Foundling, often known simply as Tom Jones, is a comic novel by English playwright and novelist Henry Fielding. It is a Bildungsroman and a picaresque novel. It was first published on 28 February 1749 in London and is among the earliest English works to be classified as a novel. It is the earliest novel mentioned by W. Somerset Maugham in his 1948 book Great Novelists and Their Novels among the ten best novels of the world.

The novel is highly organised despite its length. Samuel Taylor Coleridge argued that it has one of the "three most perfect plots ever planned", alongside Oedipus Tyrannus and The Alchemist. It became a best seller with four editions published in its first year alone. It is generally regarded as Fielding's greatest book and as an influential English novel.

Plot
The novel's events occupy eighteen books. It opens with the narrator stating that the purpose of the novel will be to explore "human nature".

The kindly and wealthy Squire Allworthy and his sister Bridget are introduced in their wealthy estate in Somerset. Allworthy returns from London after an extended business trip and finds an abandoned baby sleeping in his bed. He summons his housekeeper, Mrs Deborah Wilkins, to take care of the child. After searching the nearby village Mrs Wilkins is told about a young woman called Jenny Jones, a servant of a schoolmaster and his wife, as the most likely person to have committed the deed. Jenny is brought before the Allworthys and admits being the one who put the baby in the bed, but she refuses to reveal the father's identity. Mr Allworthy mercifully removes Jenny to a place where her reputation will be unknown and tells his sister to raise the boy, whom he names Thomas, in his household.

Two brothers, Dr Blifil and Captain Blifil, regularly visit the Allworthy estate. The doctor introduces the captain to Bridget in the hope of marrying into Allworthy's wealth. The couple soon marries. After the marriage, Captain Blifil begins to show a coldness to his brother, who eventually feels obliged to leave the house for London. He does, and, soon after, he dies "of a broken heart". Captain Blifil and his wife start to grow cool towards one another, and the former is found dead from apoplexy one evening after taking his customary evening stroll before dinner. By then, he has fathered a boy who grows up with the bastard Tom. Captain Blifil's son, known as Master Blifil, is a miserable and jealous boy who conspires against Tom.

Tom grows into a vigorous and lusty yet honest and kind-hearted youth. He tends to be closer friends with the servants and gamekeepers than with members of the gentry. He is close friends with Black George, who is the gamekeeper. His first love is Molly, Black George's second daughter and a local beauty. She throws herself at Tom, who gets her pregnant and then feels obliged to offer her his protection. After some time, however, Tom finds out that Molly is somewhat promiscuous. He then falls in love with a neighbouring squire's lovely daughter, Sophia Western. Tom and Sophia confess their love for each other after Tom breaks his arm rescuing Sophia. Tom's status as a bastard causes Sophia's father and Allworthy to disapprove their love. This class friction gives Fielding an opportunity for biting social commentary. The inclusion of prostitution and sexual promiscuity in the plot was also novel for its time, and it was the foundation for criticism of the book's "lowness".

Squire Allworthy falls ill and is convinced that he is dying. His family and servants gather around his bed as he disposes of his wealth. He gives a favourable amount of his wealth to Tom Jones, which displeases Master Blifil. Tom doesn't care about what he has been given, since his only concern is Allworthy's health. Allworthy's health improves, and we learn that he will live. At the same time, Mrs. Bridget Allworthy dies in London. Tom Jones is so excited that he begins to get drunk and gets into a fight with Master Blifil. Sophia wants to conceal her love for Tom, so she gives a majority of her attention to Blifil when the three of them are together. This leads to Sophia's aunt, Mrs Western, believing that Sophia and Blifil are in love. Squire Western wants Sophia to marry Blifil in order to gain property from the Allworthy estate. Blifil learns of Sophia's true affection for Tom Jones and is angry. Blifil tells Allworthy that, on the day he almost died, Tom was out drinking and singing and celebrating his coming death. This leads Tom to be banished.

Tom's banishment seems to ensure that Sophia will be forced to marry Blifil, whom she finds odious, so she flees to avoid that fate. After Tom is expelled from Allworthy's estate he begins his adventures across Britain, eventually ending up in London. On the way, he meets a barber, Partridge, who was banished from town because he was thought to be Tom's father. He becomes Tom's faithful companion in the hope of restoring his reputation. During their journey, they end up at an inn. While they are there, a lady and her maid arrive. An angry man arrives, and the chambermaid points him in the direction she thinks he needs to go. He bursts in on Tom and Mrs Waters, a woman whom Tom rescued, in bed together. The man, however, was looking for Mrs Fitzpatrick and leaves. Sophia and her maid arrive at the same inn, and Partridge unknowingly reveals the relationship between Tom and Mrs Waters. Sophia leaves with Mrs Fitzpatrick, who is her cousin, and heads for London. They arrive at the home of Lady Bellaston, followed by Tom and Partridge. Eventually, Tom tells Sophia that his true love is for her and no one else. Tom ends up getting into a duel with Mr Fitzpatrick, which leads to his imprisonment.

Eventually, the secret of Tom's birth is revealed after a brief scare involving Mrs Waters. Mrs Waters is really Jenny Jones, Tom's supposed mother, and Tom fears that he has committed incest. This, however, is not the case, as Tom's mother is in fact Bridget Allworthy, who conceived him after an affair with a schoolmaster. Tom is thus Squire Allworthy's nephew. After finding out about the intrigues of Blifil, who is Tom's half-brother, Allworthy decides to bestow most of his inheritance on Tom. After Tom's true parentage is revealed, he and Sophia marry, as Squire Western no longer harbours any misgivings about Tom marrying his daughter. Sophia bears Tom a son and a daughter, and the couple live on happily with the blessings of Squire Western and Squire Allworthy.

Style
The highly visible narrator is a central feature of Tom Jones. Each book begins with a prefatory chapter directly addressing the reader, and the narrator provides a continuous commentary on characters and events. According to Wayne C. Booth, the reader's relationship with the narrator is something like a subplot. The reader becomes more attached to the narrator over the course of the book, culminating in a heartfelt farewell.

Fielding presents a panorama of contemporary British life, drawing characters from many different classes and occupations. But Ian Watt argues in The Rise of the Novel that Fielding did not aim at the "realism of presentation" of lifelike detail and psychology practised by authors such as Richardson. Watt claims that Fielding was more focused on the "realism of assessment", the way in which the novel engages a broad range of topics with intelligence and "a wise assessment of life".

Themes
The main theme of the novel is the contrast between Tom Jones's good nature, flawed but eventually corrected by his love for virtuous Sophia Western, and his half-brother Blifil's hypocrisy. Secondary themes include several other examples of virtue (especially that of Squire Allworthy), hypocrisy (especially that of Thwackum) and villainy (for example, that of Mrs Western and Ensign Northerton), sometimes tempered by repentance (for instance Square and Mrs Waters née Jones).

Both introductory chapters to each book and interspersed commentary introduce a long line of further themes. For instance, introductory chapters dwell extensively on bad writers and critics, quite unrelated to the plot but apologetic to the author and the novel itself; and authorial commentary on several characters shows strong opposition to Methodism, calling it fanatical and heretical, and implying an association between Methodism and hypocrites such as the younger Blifil.

The novel takes place against the backdrop of the Jacobite rising of 1745. Characters take different sides over the rebellion, which was an attempt to restore Roman Catholicism as the established religion of England and to undo the Glorious Revolution. At one point Sophia Western is even mistaken for Jenny Cameron, the supposed lover of Bonnie Prince Charlie. Good-natured characters are often moderately loyalist and Anglican, or even supporters of the House of Hanover, while ill-natured characters (Mrs Western) or mistaken ones (Partridge) can be Jacobites, or (like Squire Western) anti-Hanoverian.

List of characters

 Master Thomas "Tom" Jones, a bastard and Squire Allworthy's ward
 Miss Sophia "Sophy" Western , Western's only daughter, the model of virtue, beauty and all good qualities
 Master William Blifil , the son of Captain Blifil and Bridget; a hypocrite and Tom Jones's rival
 Squire Allworthy, the wealthy squire of an estate in Somerset and Tom's guardian; of irreproachable character and good nature
 Squire Western, a wealthy squire and huntsman who owns an estate bordering on Squire Allworthy's; a simpleton who wants to marry his daughter Sophia to Allworthy's heir (first Blifil and then Jones)
 Miss Bridget Allworthy (later Mrs Blifil), Allworthy's sister
 Lady Bellaston, Tom's lover and a leading figure in London society, who tries to force Sophia into marriage to a lord by having her raped by him, so that she can have Jones to herself
 Mrs Honour Blackmore, Sophia's maid; egotistical and inconstant to her employer
 Dr Blifil, Captain Blifil's brother; dies of a broken heart at his brother's rejection
 Captain John Blifil, a captain in the army and Bridget Allworthy's husband; with Methodist tendencies
 Lawyer Dowling, a lawyer
 Lord Fellamar, a peer and socialite; unsuccessfully conspires with Lady Bellaston to rape Sophia so as to force her into marriage
 Brian Fitzpatrick, an Irishman who abuses his wife, Harriet Fitzpatrick
 Harriet Fitzpatrick, Mrs Western's former ward and Fitzpatrick's wife; a cousin and friend of Sophia, but lacking her virtue
 Miss Jenny Jones (later Mrs Waters), the Partridges' servant, a very intelligent woman who is believed to be Tom's mother
 Mrs Miller, mother of Nancy and Betty Miller
 Miss Betty Miller, pre-adolescent daughter of Mrs Miller
 Miss Nancy Miller (later Nightingale), a good-natured girl who is imposed on by Mr Nightingale and is ruined by him, together with her family, by lack of constancy in virtue
 Mr Nightingale, a young gentleman of leisure; saved from ruining his first true love by Jones's entreaties
 Mr Benjamin "Little Benjamin" Partridge, a teacher, barber, and surgeon, suspected to be Tom Jones's father
 Mrs Partridge, Partridge's extremely ill-natured first wife
 Mr George "Black George" Seagrim, Allworthy and later Western's gamekeeper; a poor man and the object of Tom's charity
 Miss Molly "Moll" Seagrim, Black George's second daughter and Tom Jones's first lover; has a bastard son, possibly not by Tom
 Mr Thomas Square, a humanist philosopher and tutor to Tom and Master Blifil; a hypocrite who hates Jones and favors Blifil, but eventually repents
 The Rev. Mr Roger Thwackum, tutor to Tom and Master Blifil, a hypocrite who hates Tom Jones, favors Master Blifil and conspires with the latter against the former
 Miss Western, Squire Western's unmarried sister, who wrongly believes herself to "know the World" (both international and national politics and social mores)
 Mrs Deborah Wilkins, Bridget's servant

Adaptations and influences
The book was made into the 1963 film Tom Jones written by John Osborne, directed by Tony Richardson, and starring Albert Finney as Tom. In 1964, a studio cast recording of a musical adaptation produced by Theatre Productions Records featured Clive Revill (as the narrator), Bob Roman (Tom), Karen Morrow (Mrs. Waters); music by Bob Roberts, lyrics by Ruth Batchelor, arranged and conducted by Peter Matz. It inspired the 1976 film The Bawdy Adventures of Tom Jones. It has also been the basis of operas by François-André Philidor (Tom Jones, 1765); by Edward German (Tom Jones, 1907); and by Stephen Oliver in 1975. A BBC adaptation dramatised by Simon Burke was broadcast in 1997 with Max Beesley in the title role. The book has also been adapted for the stage by Joan Macalpine. In 2014, Jon Jory adapted the novel for the stage. In 2020, it was announced that the book will also be adapted into a jukebox musical called What's New Pussycat? featuring songs by the singer Tom Jones setting the story in the 1960s. A TV miniseries will star Solly McLeod and Sophie Wilde in 2023.

See also

 Illegitimacy in fiction

Bibliography

Editions
 Fielding, Henry Tom Jones (London: Andrew Millar, 1749). The first edition.
 Fielding, Henry "Tom Jones"  (New York:  The Modern Library, 1931).  First Modern Library Edition.
 Fielding, Henry Tom Jones (Wesleyan University Press, 1975) . Edited by Martin Battestin and Fredson C. Bowers. Widely taken to be the authoritative version.
 Fielding, Henry Tom Jones (New York: W. W. Norton, 1995) . Edited with notes by Sheridan Baker. This edition includes a collection of critical essays; it is based on the fourth and final edition of the novel, though it also includes the version of The Man of the Hill episode found in the 3rd edition in an appendix.
 Fielding, Henry Tom Jones (London: Everyman's Library, 1998) . Edited with an introduction and notes by Douglas Brooks-Davies.
 Fielding, Henry Tom Jones (Harmondsworth: Penguin, 2005) . Edited with an introduction and notes by Tom Keymer and Alice Wakely.
 Fielding, Henry Tom Jones (Harmondsworth: Penguin, 1985). Edited with an introduction and notes by Reginald P. C. Mutter.

Critical collections
 Compton, Neil (ed.) Henry Fielding: Tom Jones, A Casebook (Basingstoke: Macmillan, 1987) . Includes essays by William Empson, Ian Watt, and Claude Rawson, amongst others.

Monographs
 Battestin, Martin C. The Providence of Wit (Oxford: Oxford University Press, 1970) . Includes a chapter on Tom Jones.
 Ewers, Chris. Mobility in the English Novel from Defoe to Austen (Woodbridge: Boydell and Brewer, 2018) . Includes a chapter on Tom Jones.
 Power, Henry. Epic into Novel (Oxford: Oxford University Press, 2015) . Includes two chapters on Tom Jones.
 Rogers, Pat The Augustan Vision (London: Methuen, 1978) . Includes a chapter on Fielding, which treats Tom Jones briefly.
 Watt, Ian The Rise of the Novel (London: Pimlico, 2000) . Includes a chapter on Tom Jones, preceded by one titled 'Fielding and the epic theory of the novel'.

References

Sources
 .
 .
 Battestin, Martin. The Providence of Wit: Aspects of Form in Augustan Literature and the Arts. Oxford: Clarendon, 1974.
 Hunter, J. Paul.  Before Novels: The Cultural Context of Eighteenth-Century English Fiction. New York: WW Norton and Co., 1990.
 McKeon, Michael. The Origins of the English Novel, 1600–1740. Baltimore: Johns Hopkins University Press, 1987.
 Paulson, Ronald. Satire and the Novel in the Eighteenth Century. New Haven: Yale University Press, 1967.
 Richetti, John. "Representing an Under Class: Servants and Proletarians in Fielding and Smollett." The New Eighteenth Century: Theory, Politics, English Literature. Eds. Felicity Nussbaum and Laura Brown. London: Routledge, 1987.
 Richetti, John. "The Old Order and the New Novel of the Mid-Eighteenth Century: Narrative Authority in Fielding and Smollett." Eighteenth-Century Fiction 2 (1990): 99–126.
 Smallwood, Angela J. Fielding and the Woman Question. New York: St. Martin's, 1989.
 Spacks, Patricia Meyer. Desire and Truth: Functions of Plot in Eighteenth-Century English Novels. Chicago: University of Chicago Press, 1990.
 Watt, Ian. The Rise of the Novel: Studies in Defoe, Richardson and Fielding. Berkeley: University of California Press, 1957.

External links

 
 The History of Tom Jones, a Foundling from Project Gutenberg (plain text and HTML)
 
 
 Tom Jones the Musical full album audio at Internet Archive

1749 novels
British novels adapted into films
British novels adapted into plays
Novels adapted into operas
Novels by Henry Fielding
18th-century British novels
Picaresque novels
English novels
Novels set in Somerset